Brett Evan Erlich  (born March 1, 1982) is an American political comedian featured as a writer, producer and host on TV shows and Web sites. He is the executive producer of The Young Turks network, where he also appears as a host of "Happy Half Hour". He also appears on ABC News Primetime Specials hosted by Barbara Walters and Katie Couric.

From 2006–2011, Erlich was a writer, producer, and host of InfoMania, a comedic news show on the cable station Current TV. He formerly wrote, co-hosted (with Ellen Fox), and co-executive produced The Rotten Tomatoes Show (2009–2010). InfoMania was canceled in the summer of 2011.

From July 1, 2006 to July 9, 2007, Erlich wrote, associate-produced, and co-hosted Google Current.

Early life and education
Born in 1982 in the San Fernando Valley near Los Angeles, California, he attended local public schools and graduated from high school at Chaminade College Preparatory in West Hills. He studied at Stanford University, graduating in 2004. While there, he co-founded the Stanford Shakespeare Society. This student-run company is devoted to the production and performance of Shakespearean and Shakespeare-influenced drama.

Career
Erlich has become established as a political comedian in TV shows and on the Web. From July 1, 2006 to July 9, 2007, Erlich wrote, associate-produced, and co-hosted Google Current.

From 2006–2011, Brett was a writer, producer, and host of InfoMania, a half-hour comedic news show on the cable station Current TV. It was created by Madeline Smithberg, who created The Daily Show with Jon Stewart, and executive producer David Nickoll.

Erlich formerly wrote, co-hosted (with Ellen Fox), and co-executive produced The Rotten Tomatoes Show on Current TV (2009–2010). After its cancellation, some of its material was compressed into a weekly 2-minute segment on InfoMania. This show was cancelled in the summer of 2011.

Erlich's segments on InfoMania and Google Current have included "Viral Video Film School," "Guilty Pleasures," "Men Menning," "Everybody's Doin' It," "Spam I Got," "Ostensibly on the Scene," "World Leader Flickr Sites," "Retroactive Interview," and "FearCast."

His show, Viral Video Film School, was nominated for a Webby Award in 2010. It was a People's Voice Winner in the Online Film & Video "How To & DIY" category.

His video Saw the Musical was nominated for a 2011 Webby in the Variety category; it  lost to Zach Galifianakis' Between Two Ferns.

In 2012 Erlich appeared in the independent feature Dead Dad.

In the fall of 2013, Erlich became the online host of Marvel's Agents of S.H.I.E.L.D.: Declassified, a spinoff online show on ABC.com. It is companion to the ABC Network show, Marvel's Agents of S.H.I.E.L.D. Declassified features recaps, sketches and featurettes to bring fans up to speed. According to Variety, the network plans three expanded installments during the season to delve into the series’ more provocative storylines, with the help of some special guests.

Personal life 
In 2017, Erlich married longtime girlfriend Brooke Marks.

Notes and references

External links
Stanford Shakespeare Society

Living people
American television writers
American male television writers
Current TV people
The Young Turks people
Television personalities from Los Angeles
Stanford University alumni
1982 births
Chaminade College Preparatory School (California) alumni
Writers from Los Angeles